Alexander Hamilton Coffroth (May 18, 1828 – September 2, 1906) was a Democratic member of the U.S. House of Representatives from Pennsylvania.

Life and career
Alexander H. Coffroth was born in Somerset, Pennsylvania.  He attended the public schools and Somerset Academy.  He published a Democratic paper in Somerset for five years.  He studied law in the law office of Hon. Jeremiah S. Black, and was admitted to the bar in February 1851 at Somerset, where he practiced his profession.  He was a delegate to several Democratic State conventions, as well as a delegate to the 1860 Democratic National Conventions which assembled in Charleston, South Carolina, and Baltimore, Maryland.  He served as an assessor of internal revenue in 1867, and was a delegate to the 1872 Democratic National Convention.

Coffroth was elected as a Democrat to the Thirty-eighth Congress. During his term, he supported the passage of the Thirteenth Amendment, along with some other Democrats, such as Archibald McAllister. He claimed reelection to the Thirty-ninth Congress, was seated on February 19, 1866, and served until July 18, 1866, when he was succeeded by William H. Koontz, who contested the election.  He was again elected to the Forty-sixth Congress.  He served as chairman of the United States House Committee on Invalid Pensions during the Forty-sixth Congress.  He was not a candidate for renomination in 1880.  He resumed the practice of law in Somerset and died in Markleton, Pennsylvania, in 1906.  He was interred in Union Cemetery in Somerset.

Coffroth was the last surviving pallbearer who had served at the funeral of President Abraham Lincoln.

During Coffroth's tenure as its Representative, Pennsylvania's 16th district took in Adams County, which includes Gettysburg, site in 1863 of the Battle of Gettysburg and the Gettysburg Address.

Fictional portrayals
In the 2012 film Lincoln, Coffroth is portrayed by Boris McGiver.

Notes

Sources

The Political Graveyard

1828 births
1906 deaths
Pennsylvania lawyers
Democratic Party members of the United States House of Representatives from Pennsylvania
19th-century American politicians